Southwest Territory or variant, may refer to:

West of the Appalachians, south of the Ohio, east of the Mississippi
 Territory South of the River Ohio (aka Territory of the South-West), territory that became the state of Tennessee, USA
 Southwest Territory's at-large congressional district

North American southwest
 Old Southwest of the American frontier in the USA
 Southwestern United States, what became of the frontier after the Old West era in the USA
 Archaic Southwest, the pre-Columbian North American southwest

Other uses
 Southwest Territory (Six Flags Great America), Gurnee, Illinois, USA; a themepark attraction
 South West Africa, (South African non-governing territory of the South West), now Namibia
 Southwestern Krai or Southwestern Land in the historical Russian Empire

See also

 
 Southwest (disambiguation)
 South (disambiguation)
 West (disambiguation)